Ziyat Asiyatovich Paigin (born 8 February 1995) is a Russian professional ice hockey defenceman. He is currently under contract with Avangard Omsk in the Kontinental Hockey League (KHL). He was selected with the Edmonton Oilers' last team pick in the 2015 NHL Entry Draft, 209th overall.

Playing career
Paigin played youth hockey with Dizel Penza before he was drafted in the 2012 KHL Junior Draft, 82nd overall by Ak Bars Kazan. Paigin made his Kontinental Hockey League debut playing with Ak Bars Kazan during the 2014–15 KHL season registering a goal and an assist in 33 games.

In the following 2015–16 season, despite Paigin's size and potential he was unable to break into Kazan's blueline full-time and after 8 games was traded to HC Sochi on 10 October 2015. Inserted into a regular role on Sochi's defense, Paigin instantly broke out offensively, scoring 9 goals and 27 points in 37 games and as a result was selected to participate in the 2016 KHL All-Star Game.

In the off-season, despite Sochi's attempts to extend the contract of Paigin, he was traded back to original club, Ak Bars Kazan, in exchange for financial compensation on 2 May 2016. In the following 2016–17 season, Paigin failed to build upon his previous season's success with Sochi. With reduced ice-time and also hampered by injury, Paigin posted 1 goal and 4 points in 17 games with Ak Bars. Incurring a demotion with Bars Kazan of the VHL at seasons end, Paigin opted to pursue his NHL ambitions in agreeing to an amateur try-out contract with the Oilers American Hockey League affiliate, the Bakersfield Condors, on 5 April 2017. Paigin reportedly was not happy with his ice time and role within his KHL team. On 11 April 2017, Paigin was signed by the Oilers to a two-year entry-level contract.

In the 2017–18 season, after attending the Oilers' training camp, Paigin was among the first cuts reassigned to continue with the Condors. He appeared in just 7 scoreless games and also masked as a frequent healthy scratch before Paigin was placed on unconditional waivers by the Oilers in order for a mutual termination of his contract on 21 November 2017. On December 15, 2017, he returned to the KHL, signing a two-year contract with Lokomotiv Yaroslavl.

In the 2018–19 season, Paigin dressed in only 8 games with 1 assist for Lokomotiv before he was reassigned to the VHL with HC Lada Togliatti. On 7 December 2018, Paigin returned to the scene of his success, as he was traded by Yaroslavl to HC Sochi in exchange for financial compensation.

At the conclusion of the season, Paigin's reunion with Sochi was short lived as he was traded to HC Neftekhimik Nizhnekamsk in exchange for financial compensation on 8 July 2019. In the following 2019–20 season, Paigin made a career best 52 appearances with Neftekhimik, registering 12 points.

On 1 May 2020, Paigin as a free agent returned for a second stint with Lokomotiv Yaroslavl by agreeing to a two-year contract. He was later released by Lokomotiv, opting to move to fellow KHL club, Torpedo Nizhny Novgorod on 27 September 2020.

Paigin returned to Torpedo to begin the 2022–23 season, however after tallying 1 goal in 4 games he was traded to Avangard Omsk in exchange for financial compensation on 11 October 2022. He was immediately signed to a three-year, contract extension with Omsk.

Career statistics

Regular season and playoffs

International

References

External links

1995 births
Living people
Ak Bars Kazan players
Avangard Omsk players
Bakersfield Condors players
Bars Kazan players
Edmonton Oilers draft picks
HC Lada Togliatti players
JHC Bars players
Lokomotiv Yaroslavl players
HC Neftekhimik Nizhnekamsk players
Sportspeople from Penza
Russian ice hockey defencemen
HC Sochi players
Timrå IK players
Torpedo Nizhny Novgorod players